John Rognes may refer to:
 John Rognes (army officer)
 John Rognes (mathematician)